The Methow Valley News is a weekly newspaper in Twisp, Washington, United States. It was established in 1903 in Twisp by Harry Marble. Marble ran the paper until he sold it in 1945 to Claude Watkins, who died in 1961. Publishers after Watkins' death include Dennis Lince, Jack Stoner, Dexter Jones and Don Nelson. , it publishes weekly on Wednesdays and has a circulation of about 3,400.

The Methow Valley News staff received 41 awards at the 2019 Washington Newspaper Publishers Association Better Newspaper Contest.

References

External links 
 Official website

Newspapers published in Washington (state)
Weekly newspapers published in the United States